Harry Johnson (8 August 1913 – 1976) was an English footballer  who played at left-back for Newcastle United, Port Vale, and Hartlepools United in the 1930s.

Career
Johnson played for Walker Park, before joining Newcastle United in 1933. He spent four years at the club, making five league appearances. During his time at St James' Park, the "Magpies" were relegated out of the First Division in 1933–34 and made unsuccessfully pushes for promotion in 1934–35, 1935–36, and 1936–37. He signed with Port Vale in June 1937. He made 21 Third Division North and cup appearances in the 1937–38 season, before he was transferred away from The Old Recreation Ground to Hartlepools United.

Style of play
Johnson was a 'tough-tackling' left-back.

Career statistics
Source:

References

1913 births
1976 deaths
Footballers from Newcastle upon Tyne
English footballers
Association football fullbacks
Newcastle United F.C. players
Port Vale F.C. players
Hartlepool United F.C. players
English Football League players